"Deep Cover", also known as "187", is the debut solo single by American rapper Dr. Dre and his first track released after the breakup of N.W.A. The track was recorded for the soundtrack of the film Deep Cover. The song features fellow American rapper Snoop Doggy Dogg in his first appearance on a record release.

History
The album peaked on the Billboard 200 albums chart at #166 on July 25, 1992. Apart from the soundtrack compilation, it also appeared as a single and on Dr. Dre's First Round Knock Out, which spent two weeks on the Billboard 200 starting at #52 and later on several greatest hits albums, including: Doggy Stuff and Doggy Style Hits.  Like the artist indication on the original 12" vinyl says, "Dr. Dre introducing Snoop Doggy Dogg", it is the first time Snoop Dogg was featured on a record. As a single it had no major breakthrough regarding sales, but it launched Snoop Dogg's career. It samples a number of 1960s, 1970s, and 1980s funk acts, such as Undisputed Truth's "(I Know) I'm Losing You," the song "Bad Times" by Tavares, and Sly & the Family Stone's "Sing a Simple Song", which provided the drumbeat. The bassline is similar to part of the bassline found in the jazz composition "Zoltan," written by Woody Shaw and performed by Shaw, organist Larry Young, and Joe Henderson and Elvin Jones, on Larry Young's album "Unity."

The single was set to be released on The Chronic, but fallout from Body Count's banned song, "Cop Killer", prevented it since this song is also about killing police officers. Despite being praised by critics, the film itself did not have much commercial success, and it only received two nominations on the Independent Spirits Awards in 1993; however, the song was well received. During the 2007 VH1 Hip Hop Honors show, T.I. and B.G. performed this song during Snoop's honor ceremony.

Music video
The plot of the video resembles that of the same-titled movie starring Laurence Fishburne and Jeff Goldblum. An undercover cop goes deep in the hierarchic pyramid of the underground mafia to get the bosses locked up, and "goes deep" also by getting addicted to drugs while trying to not reveal himself. The video begins in the first scene with Snoop, marking Snoop's first appearance in a music video, Dre and a black kingpin in a smoky office in the middle of an initiation where Snoop has to decide between the pipe and being caught up. After that introduction the music starts but the rest of the video is rather cut-to-cut and is a mixture of some five seconds long takes in black and white and some pictures from the motion picture. The scenes take place in a filthy concrete bungalow with several crack addicts and a projector flashing the movie itself on the wall, in addition to a rooftop of a building with the skyline of Downtown Los Angeles directly behind. The house is later raided by the drug squad. There's also a scene with Snoop and Dre wearing business suits in a car, but it has no additional meaning to the plot.

Other versions

"One Eight Seven" and "187um"
A second version of this song, entitled "One Eight Seven", was released as a B-side track on the 1992 Dre Day single. It features the same chorus as the soundtrack version but with entirely new verses and a slightly modified beat.

A third version was released as "187um" on the 1995 hip-hop compilation album One Million Strong, and is sometimes referred to as the "Deep Cover remix". It has the same alternate verses as "One Eight Seven", further differences in the beat (including some scratching), and a more explicit chorus, replacing "undercover cop" with "motherfuckin' cop".

The titles of these versions, like the choruses, refer to the paragraph number of the California Penal Code that defines murder.

"Twinz (Deep Cover '98)"

The rappers Big Pun and Fat Joe collaborated to make a cover of the song titled "Twinz (Deep Cover '98)", for Pun's debut studio album Capital Punishment, released in 1998. The idea for the  song was suggested to Pun by Joe, who liked Snoop and Dre's song, and wanted to use it as something listeners of both the East Coast and West Coast rap scenes could listen to. The song was released as a single in 1997. Snoop Dogg also made a brief appearance in its music video.

Credits

 Dr. Dre: voice, producer, drums programming, keyboards 
 Snoop Dogg: voice, songwriter 
 Colin Wolfe: bass, keyboards
 Eric Borders: guitar

Track listing
 CD promo
 "Deep Cover" (radio version) – 3:48
 "Deep Cover" (u-n-c-e-n-s-o-r-e-d) – 4:27

 12" vinyl
 "Deep Cover" (radio version) – 3:48
 "Deep Cover" (u-n-c-e-n-s-o-r-e-d) – 4:27
 "Deep Cover" (instrumental) – 3:54

 12" vinyl – Soul 2 Soul
 "Deep Cover" (vocal mix) – 4:27
 "Deep Cover" (instrumental dub) – 3:54
 "Party Groove" – 4:22
 "Back to Life" – 3:20

Charts

Weekly charts

References

External links

Snoop Dogg songs
Dr. Dre songs
1992 debut singles
Song recordings produced by Dr. Dre
Songs written by Dr. Dre
Songs written for films
Songs written by Snoop Dogg
Gangsta rap songs
1992 songs
SOLAR Records singles
Epic Records singles
Songs about crime
Songs about drugs
Songs about police officers